The 1947 La Flèche Wallonne was the 11th edition of La Flèche Wallonne cycle race and was held on 15 June 1947. The race started in Mons and finished in Liège. The race was won by Ernest Sterckx.

General classification

References

1947 in road cycling
1947
1947 in Belgian sport